Greenbottle may refer to:
Green bottle fly, applied to numerous species of Calliphoridae or blowfly
GreenBottle, a company manufacturing cartons
Greenbottle, a character in the Australian comedic radio series Yes, What?

See also 
 Soda-lime glass, used for making bottles, which are often green
 Bottle green, a shade of green
 Bluebottle (disambiguation)